Maggie Reilly (born 15 September 1956) is a Scottish singer best known for her collaborations with the composer and instrumentalist Mike Oldfield. Most notably, she performed lead vocals on the Oldfield songs "Family Man", "Moonlight Shadow", "To France", and "Foreign Affair", all of which were international hits in the early 1980s.

Career 

Reilly first came to prominence as a member of the 1970s soul outfit Cado Belle (previously named Joe Cool) and released one album with them in 1976.

She is best known for her collaborations with the composer Mike Oldfield between 1980 and 1984, especially by co-writing and performing the vocals on "Family Man" (and other tracks on the album Five Miles Out), "Moonlight Shadow", "Foreign Affair", and "To France" (and other tracks on the album Discovery).

In 1992, she released her debut solo album Echoes, from which the singles "Everytime We Touch", "Tears in the Rain" and "Wait" were the most successful. A series of solo albums were released over the next 27 years.

She has also worked with many other artists, including Mike Batt (on his Hunting of the Snark album), Jack Bruce, Dave Greenfield & Jean-Jacques Burnel, Nick Mason & Rick Fenn, Michael Cretu, Lesiëm, Ralph McTell, Simon Nicol of Fairport Convention, Stefan Zauner of Münchener Freiheit, Runrig, The Sisters of Mercy, and Smokie. "Moonlight Shadow 2k14" (Michael Fall remix) was released on 23 May 2014 on the German label ZYX Music.

Awards and nominations
{| class=wikitable
|-
! Year !! Awards !! Work !! Category !! Result !! Ref.
|-
| rowspan=2|1993
| RSH Gold Awards
| rowspan=2|Herself
| Best Artist with German producer
| 
|
|-
| Danish Music Awards
| Best International Female
| 
|

Discography

Solo albums
 Echoes (1992)
 Midnight Sun (1993)
 Elena (1996)
 All the Mixes (1996) (as M.R.)
 The Best of Maggie Reilly, There and Back Again (1998)
 Starcrossed (2000)
 Save It for a Rainy Day (2002)
 Rowan (2006)
 Looking Back, Moving Forward (2009)
 Heaven Sent (2013)
 Starfields (2019)
 The Best Of Maggie Reilly: Past - Present - Future (2021)
 Happy Christmas (2021)

Solo singles

Collaborations with Mike Oldfield
 QE2 (1980)
 Five Miles Out (1982)
 Crises (1983)
 Discovery (1984)
 The Complete (1985)
 Earth Moving (1989)
 Elements – The Best of Mike Oldfield (1993)
 XXV: The Essential (1997)

Collaborations with other artists
 Cado Belle – Cado Belle (1976)
 Jim Wilkie – The Waxer (1979)
 Doll by Doll – Grand Passion (1982)
 Dave Greenfield & J.J. Burnel – Fire & Water (1983)
 Peter Blegvad – Naked Shakespeare (1983)
 Nick Mason & Rick Fenn – Profiles (1985)
 Flairck – Sleight of Hand (1986)
 Mike Batt – The Hunting of the Snark (1986)
 Jack Bruce – Willpower (1989)
 The Sisters of Mercy – Vision Thing (1990)
 Flairck – Sleight of Hand (1986)
 Jack Bruce – Somethin' Else (1992)
 Jack Bruce – Cities of the Heart (1993)
 The Lenny MacDowell Project – Lost Paradise (1993)
 Artists For Nature – Earthrise, The Rainforest Album (1994)
 Colm Wilkinson – Stage Heroes (1994)
 Juliane Werding – Du Schaffst Es (1994)
 Juliane Werding and Viktor Lazlo – Engel Wie Du (1994)
 Jack Bruce – The Collectors Edition (1996)
 Jack Bruce – Sitting on top of the World (1997)
 Simon Nicol – Before Your Time / Consonant Please Carol (1998)
 Smokie – Wild Horses – The Nashville Album (1998)
 Smokie – Our Swedish Collection (1999)
 Lesiëm – Times (2003) / Auracle (2004)
 XII Alfonso – Charles Darwin (2012)

References

External links 
 
 Heartsong, official Maggie Reilly Fan Site

1956 births
Living people
Musicians from Glasgow
20th-century Scottish women singers
Scottish folk singers
Scottish pop singers
Scottish people of Irish descent
British soft rock musicians
21st-century Scottish women singers